The shaft of a golf club is the long, tapered tube which connects the golfer's hands to the club head. While hundreds of different designs exist, the primary purpose of the golf shaft remains the same: to provide the player with a way to generate centrifugal force in order to effectively strike the ball. When properly gripped the player can hit the ball further and more accurately, whilst applying less force.

History
Early golf clubs had wooden shafts, most commonly made of hickory. These shafts were resilient and withstood the forces created by the golf swing, but unlike modern, more stiff shafts, their high flexibility required a skilled swing to produce consistent results.

Prior to 1935, hickory was the dominant material for shaft manufacturing, but it proved difficult to master for most golfers, as well as being quite frail. Steel would become the ubiquitous choice for much of the second half of the twentieth century. Although heavier than hickory, it is much stronger and more consistent in its performance. Prior to steel, a player would need a slightly different swing for each shaft given the inherent inconsistencies in the hickory shafts. The graphite shaft was first marketed in 1970 at the PGA Merchandise Show but did not gain widespread use until the mid-1990s and is now used on almost all woods and some iron sets, as the carbon-fiber composite of graphite shafts boasts increased flex for greater clubhead speed at the cost of slightly reduced accuracy due to greater torque. Steel, which generally has lower torque but less flex than graphite, is still widely preferred by many for irons, wedges and putters as these clubs stress accuracy over distance.

Graphite shafts began to emerge in the late twentieth century. The graphite shaft was invented by Frank Thomas in 1969 while working as Chief Design Engineer for Shakespeare Sporting Goods, in collaboration with Union Carbide. The original graphite shafts manufactured by Shakespeare Sporting Goods were filament wound, had extremely consistent properties and were extremely expensive. Subsequent, less expensive flagwrapped versions of the graphite shaft introduced by other manufacturers several years later had inconsistent properties and as a result professionals and skilled amateurs were initially skeptical of the new technology when compared to steel; however, advances in technology, developed by Bruce Williams, an engineer working with an Ohio-based composites company, eventually changed this perception. Graphite shafts are now more common than steel.

Design
The shaft is roughly .58 inch/14.7 millimeters in diameter near the grip and between 35-48 inches/89–115 cm in length. Shafts weigh between 45 and 150 grams depending on the material and length.

Graphite shafts are woven from carbon fiber and are generally lighter in weight than steel shafts. Graphite shafts became popular among amateurs, because lighter weight helped generate increased club-head speed. The carbon fiber also dissipated some of the stinging vibrations that were caused by poorly struck shots.

Modern composite shafts have three layers of fiber winding, adding substantial rigidity, and in turn, performance.

Shafts are quantified in a number of different ways. The most common is the shaft flex. Simply, the shaft flex is the amount that the shaft will bend when placed under a load. A stiffer shaft will not flex as much, which requires more power to bend and "whip" through the ball properly (which results in higher club speed at impact for more distance), while a more flexible shaft will whip with less power required for better distance on slower swings, but may torque and over-flex if swung with too much power causing the head not to be square, resulting in lower accuracy. Most shaft makers offer a variety of flexes. The most common are: L (Lady), A (Soft Regular, Intermediate or Senior), R (Regular), S (Stiff), and X (Tour Stiff, Extra Stiff or Strong). A regular flex shaft is generally appropriate for those with an average head speed (80-94 mph), while an A-Flex (or senior shaft) is for players with a slower swing speed (70-79 mph), and the stiffer shafts, such as S-Flex and X-Flex (Stiff and Extra-Stiff shafts) are reserved only for those players with an above average swinging speed, usually above . Some companies also offer a "stiff-regular" or "firm" flex for players whose club speed falls in the upper range of a Regular shaft (90-100 mph), allowing golfers and clubmakers to fine-tune the flex for a stronger amateur-level player.

On off-center hits, the clubhead twists as a result of a torque, reducing accuracy as the face of the club is not square to the player's stance at impact. In recent years, many manufacturers have produced and marketed many low-torque shafts aimed at reducing the twisting of the clubhead at impact, however these tend to be stiffer along their length as well. Most recently, many brands have introduced stiff-tip shafts. These shafts offer the same flex throughout most of the shaft, in order to attain the "whip" required to propel the ball properly, but also include a stiffer tip, which cuts back drastically on the lateral torque acting on the head.

Lastly, shafts are quantified by their "kick point", which is the point on the shaft where the flex is the greatest. They are generally defined as "low-kick", "medium-kick" and "high-kick", but the difference between all of these is only a few inches. Low-kick shafts flex the most at a point closer to the clubhead, which causes less of the shaft to flex and produces a higher launch angle. The higher the kickpoint, the lower the launch angle. Because kickpoint also has an effect on how much of the shaft flexes, it can be used to fine-tune the shaft's flex to the player's individual swing tempo.

Widely overlooked as a part of the club, the shaft is considered by many to be the transmission of the modern clubhead. Current graphite shafts weigh considerably less than their steel counterparts, (sometimes weighing less than 50 grams for a driver shaft) allowing for lighter clubs that can be swung at greater speed. Since 1999 performance shafts have been integrated into the club making process. These shafts are designed to address specific criteria, such as to launch the ball higher or lower or to adjust for the timing of a player's swing to load and unload the shaft at the correct moments of the swing for maximum power. Whereas in the past each club could come with only one shaft, today's clubheads can be fit with dozens of different shafts, creating the potential for a much better fit for the average golfer.

Characteristics
 Material - generally steel or graphite/carbon fiber. More exotic materials have been offered with minimal success.
 Flex - The measure of a shaft's flexibility. This measure is relative and varies among manufacturers. Most commonly referred to in terms of regular (R), stiff (S), extra stiff (X), senior (A), or ladies (L).
 Kick Point - The point over the length of the shaft where it is designed to bend. Individual shaft models are designed to flex at different points. Generally, kick points nearer to the grip end of the club tend to produce lower launching, lower spinning shots. Kick points nearer to the club head tend to produce higher launching, higher spinning shots.
 Length and Weight - These variables are used to tailor a golf club to a particular player. Shaft lengths can be altered to suit golfers of different heights. Golf shafts are manufactured in various weights to suit players of any skill or strength level.

New drivers come out all the time with new concepts of how its design is supposed to make you hit the ball further, however that is not the case. It all comes down to the shaft. The shaft is 80 percent of the club and can improve your distance by 20 yard. It is important to get the correct fitting in order for you to see the results you want.

References

Golf clubs